is a 2019 Japanese drama film directed by Takamasa Oe. It made its world premiere in the 28th Rainbow Reel Tokyo festival on July 15, 2019. The film stars Joe Nakamura and Yohdi Kondo.

Cast 

 Joe Nakamura as Kohei Kaido
 Yohdi Kondo as Yutaka "Yuta" Imaizumi
 Yoshiaki Umegaki as Priscilla
 Reina Tasaki as Mizuna Kaido
 Fumihiko Nakamura as Atsushi
 Rai Minamoto as Mimosa
 Flora Miwa as Rinka

Release 

The film was played at festivals including the 2019 Rainbow Reel Tokyo and Taoyuan Film Festivals and had a small general release in Japan, beginning on July 26 at UPLINK Kichijoji in Kichijoji, Tokyo and expanding on August 3 to cinemas in Osaka, Nagoya and Himeji.

In June 2020, it became available internationally with subtitles in English, Chinese, Thai and Indonesian for subscribers to the Taiwan-based streaming service provider Gagaoolala.

Reception 
The film received mixed reviews from 18 critics of Yahoo! Japan, which gave the film an average of 3.56 stars. Asian Movie Pulse highlighted the taboo of LGBT rights in Japan and highlighted the film in those aspects, though said that "while you can enjoy a movie that opens many colours of the rainbow and waves more than one flag, your enthusiasm might hit several walls" adding that "Unfortunately, the relationship and its hardships are the least interesting line in the narrative" and concluded that the film is "perplexing."

References

External links 

  (in Japanese)
 
 

2019 films
2019 LGBT-related films
Films set in Japan
Gay-related films
Japanese LGBT-related films
2010s Japanese-language films
LGBT-related romantic drama films
2010s Japanese films
Japanese romantic drama films